is a town located in Kitakatsuragi District, Nara Prefecture, Japan. As of April 1, 2015, the town has an estimated population of 17,831, and 7,775 households, with a density of around 2,200 persons per km2. The total area is 8.27 km2.

Education
Public schools:
Kawaidaiichi (Kawai No. 1) Elementary School
Kawaidaini (Kawai No. 2) Elementary School
Kawaidaisan (Kawai No. 3) Elementary School
Kawaidaiichi Junior High School
Kawaidaini Junior High School
Private schools:
Nishiyamato Gakuen Junior and Senior High School

Transportation

Rail
Kintetsu Railway
Tawaramoto Line: Ōwada Station - Samitagawa Station - Ikebe Station

Road
Expressways
Nishi-Meihan Expressway: Hōryūji Interchange

Sister cities
  Majuro, Marshall Islands

References

External links

 Kawai official website 

Towns in Nara Prefecture